This page lists the albums that reached number-one on the overall Top R&B/Hip-Hop Albums chart, the newly-relaunched R&B Albums chart and the Rap Albums chart in 2013. The R&B Albums chart was introduced in the January 26, 2013 issue of Billboard as a new distinct chart, returning its name to the magazine since the  rebranding of the original R&B chart in 1999. The Rap and R&B albums charts serve as partial distillations of rap and R&B-specific titles, respectively, from the overall R&B/Hip-Hop Albums chart.

List of number ones

See also
2013 in American music
2013 in hip hop music
List of number-one R&B/hip-hop songs of 2013 (U.S.)
List of Billboard 200 number-one albums of 2013

References 

2013
2013
United States RandB Hip Hop Albums